is a passenger railway station located in the city of Kasama, Ibaraki Prefecture, Japan operated by the East Japan Railway Company (JR East).

Lines
Iwama Station is served by the Jōban Line, and is located 91.9 km from the official starting point of the line at Nippori Station.

Station layout
The station consists of two opposed side platforms, connected to the station building by a footbridge. The station is staffed. Two local trains stop approximately every hour during the day.

Platforms

History
Iwama Station was opened on 4 November 1895. The station was absorbed into the JR East network upon the privatization of the Japanese National Railways (JNR) on 1 April 1987. A new station building was completed in July 2012.

Passenger statistics
In fiscal 2019, the station was used by an average of 1312 passengers daily (boarding passengers only).

Surrounding area
 former Iwama Town Hall
Iwama Post Office

See also
 List of railway stations in Japan

References

External links

  Station information JR East Station Information 

Railway stations in Ibaraki Prefecture
Jōban Line
Railway stations in Japan opened in 1895
Kasama, Ibaraki